Hyblaea tenuis is a moth in the family Hyblaeidae described by Francis Walker in 1866.

References

Hyblaeidae